Mobile security, or mobile device security, is the protection of smartphones, tablets, and laptops from threats associated with wireless computing. It has become increasingly important in mobile computing. The security of personal and business information now stored on smartphones is of particular concern.

More and more users and businesses use smartphones not only to communicate, but also to plan and organize their work and private life. Within companies, these technologies are causing profound changes in the organization of information systems and have therefore become the source of new risks. Indeed, smartphones collect and compile an increasing amount of sensitive information to which access must be controlled to protect the privacy of the user and the intellectual property of the company.

The majority of attacks are aimed at smartphones. These attacks take advantage of vulnerabilities discovered in smartphones that can result from different modes of communication, including Short Message Service (SMS, text messaging), Multimedia Messaging Service (MMS), wireless connections, Bluetooth, and GSM, the de facto international standard for mobile communications. Code-Division Multiple Access (CDMA) is more secure than other modes of communication but can still be a target. Smartphone operating systems or browsers are another weakness. Some malware makes use of the common user's limited knowledge. Only 2.1% of users reported having first-hand contact with mobile malware, according to a 2008 McAfee study, which found that 11.6% of users had heard of someone else being harmed by the problem. Yet, it is predicted that this number will rise.

Security countermeasures are being developed and applied to smartphones, from security best practices in software to the dissemination of information to end users. Countermeasures can be implemented at all levels, including operating system development, software design, and user behavior modifications.

Challenges of smartphone mobile security

Threats 
A smartphone user is exposed to various threats when they use their phone. In just the last two-quarters of 2012, the number of unique mobile threats grew by 261%, according to ABI Research. These threats can disrupt the operation of the smartphone and transmit or modify user data. Applications must guarantee privacy and integrity of the information they handle. In addition, since some apps could themselves be malware, their functionality and activities should be limited (for example, restricting the apps from accessing location information via the Global Positioning System (GPS), blocking access to the user's address book, preventing the transmission of data on the network, sending SMS messages that are billed to the user, etc.). Since the recent rise of mobile attacks, hackers have increasingly targeted smartphones through credential theft and snooping. The number of attacks targeting smartphones and other devices has risen by 50 percent. According to the study, mobile banking applications are responsible for the increase in attacks.

Malware is distributed by the attackers so that they can take over the targets' transaction information, their rights to log in, and their money. Various types of malwares are also developed with anti-detection techniques to avoid detection. Triade malware comes pre-installed on some mobile devices. In addition to Haddad, there is Lotoor, which exploits vulnerabilities in the system to repackage legitimate applications. The devices are also vulnerable due to spyware and leaky behaviors through applications. Devices connected to public networks are at risk of attacks. Mobile devices are also effective conveyance systems for malware threats, breaches of information, and thefts. Potential attackers were looking for possible weak points once Apple's iPhone and the first Android devices came onto the market. The Department of Homeland Security's cybersecurity department claims that the number of vulnerable points in smartphone operating systems has increased. As mobile phones are connected to utilities and appliances, hackers, cybercriminals, and even intelligence officials have access to these devices.

It became increasingly popular to let employees use their own devices for work-related purposes in 2011. The Crowd Research Partners study, published in 2017, reports that during 2017, most businesses that mandated the use of mobile devices were subjected to malware attacks and breaches. It has become common for rogue applications to be installed on user devices without the user's permission. They breach privacy, which hinders the effectiveness of the devices. As well as affecting the device, hidden malware is harmful. Mobile malware has been developed to exploit vulnerabilities in mobile devices. Ransomware, worms, botnets, Trojans, and viruses are some of the types. Since the introduction of mobile banking apps and other apps, which are vital targets for hackers, malware has been rampant. Trojan-droppers can also avoid detection of malware. The attackers who use the malware on the device are able to avoid detection by hiding malicious code. Despite the fact that the malware inside a device does not change, the dropper generates new hashes each time. Additionally, droppers can also create a multitude of files, which can lead to the creation of viruses. Android mobile devices are prone to Trojan-Droppers. The banking Trojans also enable attacks on the banking applications on the phone, which leads to the theft of data for use in stealing money and funds. Additionally, there are jailbreaks for iOS devices, which work by disabling the signing of codes on iPhones so that applications not downloaded from the App Store can be operated. In this way, all the protection layers offered by iOS are disrupted, exposing the device to malware. These outside applications don't run in a sandbox, and as a result, it exposes potential security problems. By installing malicious credentials and virtual private networks (VPN) to direct information to malicious systems, there are attack vectors developed to change the mobile devices' configuration settings. In addition, there is spyware that tends to be installed on mobile devices in order to track an individual. Malicious apps can also be installed without the owners' permission or knowledge.

Wi-Fi interference technologies can also attack mobile devices through potentially insecure networks. By compromising the network, hackers are able to gain access to key data. A VPN, on the other hand, can be used to secure networks. As soon as a system is threatened, an active VPN will operate. There are also social engineering techniques, such as phishing. With phishing, unsuspecting victims are sent links to lead them to malicious websites. The attackers can then hack into the victim's device and copy all of its information. However, mobile device attacks can be prevented with technologies. Containerization is an example, as it allows the creation of a hardware infrastructure that separates the business data from other data. By detecting malicious traffic and rogue access points, there is network protection. Data security is also ensured through authentication.

There are three prime targets for attackers:
 Data: smartphones are devices for data management and may contain sensitive data like credit card numbers, authentication information, private information, activity logs (calendar, call logs).
 Identity: smartphones are highly customizable, so the device or its contents can easily be associated with a specific person.
 Availability: attacking a smartphone can limit access to it and deprive the owner of its use.

There are a number of threats to mobile devices, including annoyance, stealing money, invading privacy, propagation, and malicious tools. Vulnerability in mobile devices is a weak spot that will allow an attacker to decrease a systems security. There are three elements that intercepts when vulnerability occurs and they are a system weakness, attacker access to the flaw, and attacker competence to exploit the flaw.
 Botnets: attackers infect multiple machines with malware that victims generally acquire via e-mail attachments or from compromised applications or websites. The malware then gives hackers remote control of "zombie" devices, which can then be instructed to perform harmful acts.
 Malicious applications: hackers upload malicious programs or games to third-party smartphone application marketplaces. The programs steal personal information and open backdoor communication channels to install additional applications and cause other problems.
 Malicious links on social networks: an effective way to spread malware where hackers can place Trojans, spyware, and backdoors.
 Spyware: hackers use this to hijack phones, allowing them to hear calls, see text messages and e-mails as well as track someone's location through GPS updates.

The source of these attacks are the same actors found in the non-mobile computing space. 
 Professionals, whether commercial or military, who focus on the three targets mentioned above. They steal sensitive data from the general public, as well as undertake industrial espionage. They will also use the identity of those attacked to achieve other attacks.
 Thieves who want to gain income through data or identities they have stolen. The thieves will attack many people to increase their potential income.
 Black hat hackers who specifically attack availability. Their goal is to develop viruses, and cause damage to the device. In some cases, hackers have an interest in stealing data on devices.
 Grey hat hackers who reveal vulnerabilities. Their goal is to expose vulnerabilities of the device. Grey hat hackers do not intend on damaging the device or stealing data.

Consequences
When a smartphone is infected by an attacker, the attacker can attempt several things:
 The attacker can manipulate the smartphone as a zombie machine, that is to say, a machine with which the attacker can communicate and send commands which will be used to send unsolicited messages (spam) via SMS or email. 
 The attacker can easily force the smartphone to make phone calls. For example, one can use the API (library that contains the basic functions not present in the smartphone) PhoneMakeCall by Microsoft, which collects telephone numbers from any source such as yellow pages, and then call them. But the attacker can also use this method to call paid services, resulting in a charge to the owner of the smartphone. It is also very dangerous because the smartphone could call emergency services and thus disrupt those services. 
 A compromised smartphone can record conversations between the user and others and send them to a third party. This can cause user privacy and industrial security problems.
 An attacker can also steal a user's identity, usurp their identity (with a copy of the user's sim card or even the telephone itself), and thus impersonate the owner. This raises security concerns in countries where smartphones can be used to place orders, view bank accounts or are used as an identity card. 
 The attacker can reduce the usability of the smartphone, by discharging the battery. For example, they can launch an application that will run continuously on the smartphone processor, requiring a lot of energy and draining the battery. One factor that distinguishes mobile computing from traditional desktop PCs is their limited performance. Frank Stajano and Ross Anderson first described this form of attack, calling it an attack of "battery exhaustion" or "sleep deprivation torture". 
 The attacker can also prevent the operation and/or use of the smartphone by making it unusable. This attack can either delete the boot scripts, resulting in a phone without a functioning OS, or modify certain files to make it unusable (e.g., a script that launches at startup that forces the smartphone to restart) or even embed a startup application that would empty the battery. 
 The attacker can remove the personal (photos, music, videos, etc.) or professional data (contacts, calendars, notes) of the user.

Attacks based on communication

Attack based on SMS and MMS 
Some attacks derive from flaws in the management of SMS and MMS.

Some mobile phone models have problems in managing binary SMS messages. It is possible by sending an ill-formed block, to cause the phone to restart, leading to the denial-of-service attacks. If a user with a Siemens S55 received a text message containing a Chinese character, it would lead to a denial of service.
In another case, while the standard requires that the maximum size of a Nokia Mail address is 32 characters, some Nokia phones did not verify this standard, so if a user enters an email address over 32 characters, that leads to complete dysfunction of the e-mail handler and puts it out of commission. This attack is called "curse of silence".
A study on the safety of the SMS infrastructure revealed that SMS messages sent from the Internet can be used to perform a distributed denial of service (DDoS) attack against the mobile telecommunications infrastructure of a big city. The attack exploits the delays in the delivery of messages to overload the network.

Another potential attack could begin with a phone that sends an MMS to other phones, with an attachment. This attachment is infected with a virus. Upon receipt of the MMS, the user can choose to open the attachment. If it is opened, the phone is infected, and the virus sends an MMS with an infected attachment to all the contacts in the address book. There is a real-world example of this attack: the virus Commwarrior uses the address book and sends MMS messages including an infected file to recipients. A user installs the software, as received via MMS message. Then, the virus began to send messages to recipients taken from the address book.

Attacks based on communication networks

Attacks based on the GSM networks
The attacker may try to break the encryption of the mobile network. The GSM network encryption algorithms belong to the family of algorithms called A5. Due to the policy of security through obscurity it has not been possible to openly test the robustness of these algorithms. There were originally two variants of the algorithm: A5/1 and A5/2 (stream ciphers), where the former was designed to be relatively strong, and the latter was designed to be weak on purpose to allow easy cryptanalysis and eavesdropping. ETSI forced some countries (typically outside Europe) to use A5/2. Since the encryption algorithm was made public, it was proved it was possible to break the encryption: A5/2 could be broken on the fly, and A5/1 in about 6 hours. In July 2007, the 3GPP approved a change request to prohibit the implementation of A5/2 in any new mobile phones, which means that it has been decommissioned and is no longer implemented in mobile phones. Stronger public algorithms have been added to the GSM standard, the A5/3 and A5/4 (Block ciphers), otherwise known as KASUMI or UEA1 published by the ETSI. If the network does not support A5/1, or any other A5 algorithm implemented by the phone, then the base station can specify A5/0 which is the null algorithm, whereby the radio traffic is sent unencrypted. Even in case mobile phones are able to use 3G or 4G which have much stronger encryption than 2G GSM, the base station can downgrade the radio communication to 2G GSM and specify A5/0 (no encryption). This is the basis for eavesdropping attacks on mobile radio networks using a fake base station commonly called an IMSI catcher.

In addition, tracing of mobile terminals is difficult since each time the mobile terminal is accessing or being accessed by the network, a new temporary identity (TMSI) is allocated to the mobile terminal. The TMSI is used as the identity of the mobile terminal the next time it accesses the network. The TMSI is sent to the mobile terminal in encrypted messages.

Once the encryption algorithm of GSM is broken, the attacker can intercept all unencrypted communications made by the victim's smartphone.

Attacks based on Wi-Fi

An attacker can try to eavesdrop on Wi-Fi communications to derive information (e.g., username, password). This type of attack is not unique to smartphones, but they are very vulnerable to these attacks because very often the Wi-Fi is the only means of communication, they have to access the internet. The security of wireless networks (WLAN) is thus an important subject. Initially, wireless networks were secured by WEP keys. The weakness of WEP is a short encryption key which is the same for all connected clients. In addition, several reductions in the search space of the keys have been found by researchers. Now, most wireless networks are protected by the WPA security protocol.
WPA is based on the "Temporal Key Integrity Protocol (TKIP)" which was designed to allow migration from WEP to WPA on the equipment already deployed. The major improvements in security are the dynamic encryption keys. For small networks, the WPA is a "pre-shared key" which is based on a shared key. Encryption can be vulnerable if the length of the shared key is short. With limited opportunities for input (i.e., only the numeric keypad), mobile phone users might define short encryption keys that contain only numbers. This increases the likelihood that an attacker succeeds with a brute-force attack. The successor to WPA, called WPA2, is supposed to be safe enough to withstand a brute force attack. Free Wi-Fi is usually provided by organizations such as airports, coffee shops, and restaurants for a number of reasons. In addition to spending more time on the premises, Wi-Fi access helps them to stay productive. It's likely they'll end up spending more money if they spend more time on the premises. Enhancing customer tracking is another reason. A lot of restaurants and coffee shops compile data about their customers so they can target advertisements directly to their devices. This means that customers know what services the facility provides. Generally, individuals filter business premises based on Internet connections as another reason to gain a competitive edge. The ability to access free and fast Wi-Fi gives a business an edge over those who do not. Network security is the responsibility of the organizations. There are numerous risks associated with their unsecured Wi-Fi networks, however. The man-in-the-middle attack entails the interception and modification of data between parties. Additionally, malware can be distributed via the free Wi-Fi network and hackers can exploit software vulnerabilities to smuggle malware onto connected devices. It is also possible to eavesdrop and sniff Wi-Fi signals using special software and devices, capturing login credentials and hijacking accounts.

As with GSM, if the attacker succeeds in breaking the identification key, it will be possible to attack not only the phone but also the entire network it is connected to.

Many smartphones for wireless LANs remember they are already connected, and this mechanism prevents the user from having to re-identify with each connection. However, an attacker could create a Wi-Fi access point twin with the same parameters and characteristics as the real network. Using the fact that some smartphones remember the networks, they could confuse the two networks and connect to the network of the attacker who can intercept data if it does not transmit its data in encrypted form. 

Lasco is a worm that initially infects a remote device using the SIS file format. SIS file format (Software Installation Script) is a script file that can be executed by the system without user interaction. The smartphone thus believes the file to come from a trusted source and downloads it, infecting the machine.

Principle of Bluetooth-based attacks

Security issues related to Bluetooth on mobile devices have been studied and have shown numerous problems on different phones. One easy to exploit vulnerability: unregistered services do not require authentication, and vulnerable applications have a virtual serial port used to control the phone. An attacker only needed to connect to the port to take full control of the device. Another example: a phone must be within reach and Bluetooth in discovery mode. The attacker sends a file via Bluetooth. If the recipient accepts, a virus is transmitted. For example: Cabir is a worm that spreads via Bluetooth connection. The worm searches for nearby phones with Bluetooth in discoverable mode and sends itself to the target device. The user must accept the incoming file and install the program. After installing, the worm infects the machine.

Attacks based on vulnerabilities in software applications 

Other attacks are based on flaws in the OS or applications on the phone.

Web browser

The mobile web browser is an emerging attack vector for mobile devices. Just as common Web browsers, mobile web browsers are extended from pure web navigation with widgets and plug-ins or are completely native mobile browsers.

Jailbreaking the iPhone with firmware 1.1.1 was based entirely on vulnerabilities on the web browser. As a result, the exploitation of the vulnerability described here underlines the importance of the Web browser as an attack vector for mobile devices. In this case, there was a vulnerability based on a stack-based buffer overflow in a library used by the web browser (LibTIFF).

A vulnerability in the web browser for Android was discovered in October 2008. As the iPhone vulnerability above, it was due to an obsolete and vulnerable library. A significant difference with the iPhone vulnerability was Android's sandboxing architecture which limited the effects of this vulnerability to the Web browser process.

Smartphones are also victims of classic piracy related to the web: phishing, malicious websites, software that run in the background, etc. The big difference is that smartphones do not yet have strong antivirus software available.

The internet offers numerous interactive features that ensure a higher engagement rate, capture more and relevant data, and increase brand loyalty. Blogs, forums, social networks, and wikis are some of the most common interactive websites. Due to the tremendous growth of the internet, there has been a rapid rise in the number of security breaches experienced by individuals and businesses over the past few years. Users can balance the need to utilize the interactive features while also maintaining caution regarding security issues in several ways. Reviewing computer security regularly and correcting, upgrading, and replacing the necessary features are a few of the ways to do this. Installation of antivirus and anti-spyware programs is the most effective way of protecting the computer, and they offer protection against malware, spyware, and viruses. As well, they use firewalls, which are typically installed between the internet and the computer network in order to find a balance. By acting as a web server, the firewall prevents external users from accessing the internal computer system. Also, secure passwords and not sharing them help maintain the balance.

Operating system 

Sometimes it is possible to overcome the security safeguards by modifying the operating system itself. As real-world examples, this section covers the manipulation of firmware and malicious signature certificates. These attacks are difficult.

In 2004, vulnerabilities in virtual machines running on certain devices were revealed. It was possible to bypass the bytecode verifier and access the native underlying operating system. The results of this research were not published in detail. The firmware security of Nokia's Symbian Platform Security Architecture (PSA) is based on a central configuration file called SWIPolicy. In 2008, it was possible to manipulate the Nokia firmware before it is installed, and in fact in some downloadable versions of it, this file was human-readable, so it was possible to modify and change the image of the firmware.  This vulnerability has been solved by an update from Nokia.

In theory, smartphones have an advantage over hard drives since the OS files are in ROM and cannot be changed by malware. However, in some systems it was possible to circumvent this: in the Symbian OS it was possible to overwrite a file with a file of the same name. On the Windows OS, it was possible to change a pointer from a general configuration file to an editable file.

When an application is installed, the signing of this application is verified by a series of certificates. One can create a valid signature without using a valid certificate and add it to the list.  In the Symbian OS all certificates are in the directory: . With firmware changes explained above, it is very easy to insert a seemingly valid but malicious certificate.

Android is the OS that has been attacked the most. Because it has most of users among the operation systems. According to cybersecurity company, it reported that they have blocked about 18 million attacks in 2016.

Attacks based on hardware vulnerabilities

Electromagnetic Waveforms 
In 2015, researchers at the French government agency Agence nationale de la sécurité des systèmes d'information (ANSSI) demonstrated the capability to trigger the voice interface of certain smartphones remotely by using "specific electromagnetic waveforms". The exploit took advantage of antenna-properties of headphone wires while plugged into the audio-output jacks of the vulnerable smartphones and effectively spoofed audio input to inject commands via the audio interface.

Juice Jacking 

Juice Jacking is a physical or hardware vulnerability specific to mobile platforms. Utilizing the dual purpose of the USB charge port, many devices have been susceptible to having data exfiltrated from, or malware installed onto a mobile device by utilizing malicious charging kiosks set up in public places or hidden in normal charge adapters.

Jail-breaking and rooting 
Jailbreaking is also a physical access vulnerability, in which mobile device users initiate to hack into the devices to unlock it, and exploit weaknesses in the operating system. Mobile device users take control of their own device by jailbreaking it, and customize the interface by installing applications, change system settings that are not allowed on the devices. Thus, allowing to tweak the mobile devices operating systems processes, run programs in the background, thus devices are being expose to variety of malicious attack that can lead to compromise important private data.

Password cracking 
In 2010, researcher from the University of Pennsylvania investigated the possibility of cracking a device's password through a smudge attack (literally imaging the finger smudges on the screen to discern the user's password). The researchers were able to discern the device password up to 68% of the time under certain conditions. Outsiders may perform over-the-shoulder on victims, such as watching specific keystrokes or pattern gestures, to unlock device password or passcode.

Malicious software (malware) 

As smartphones are a permanent point of access to the internet (mostly on), they can be compromised as easily as computers with malware. A malware is a computer program that aims to harm the system in which it resides. Mobile malware variants have increased by 54% in the year 2017. Trojans, worms and viruses are all considered malware. A trojan is a program that is on the smartphone and allows external users to connect discreetly. A worm is a program that reproduces on multiple computers across a network. A virus is a malicious software designed to spread to other computers by inserting itself into legitimate programs and running programs in parallel. However, it must be said that the malware is far less numerous and important to smartphones as they are to computers.

Nonetheless, recent studies show that the evolution of malware in smartphones have rocketed in the last few years posing a threat to analysis and detection.

Privacy-intruding common apps and problematic pre-installed software 
Various common apps installed by millions can intrude privacy, even if they were installed from a software distribution service like the Google Play Store. For example, in 2022 it was shown that the popular app TikTok collects a lot of data and is required to make it available to the Chinese Communist Party (CCP) due to a national security law. This includes personal information on millions of Americans.

The firmware and "stock software" preinstalled on devices – and updated with preinstalled software – can also have undesired components or privacy-intruding default configurations or substantial security vulnerabilities. In 2019, Kryptowire had identified Android devices with malicious firmware that collected and transmitted sensitive data without users' consent.

Analysis of data traffic by popular smartphones running variants of Android found substantial by-default data collection and sharing with no opt-out by pre-installed software. This issue also can't be addressed by conventional security patches. Outgoing Internet traffic can be analyzed with packet analyzers and with firewall apps like the NetGuard firewall app for Android that allows reading blocked traffic logs.

The three phases of malware attacks 
Typically, an attack on a smartphone made by malware takes place in 3 phases: the infection of a host, the accomplishment of its goal, and the spread of the malware to other systems. Malware often uses the resources offered by infected smartphones. It will use the output devices such as Bluetooth or infrared, but it may also use the address book or email address of the person to infect the user's acquaintances. The malware exploits the trust that is given to data sent by an acquaintance.

Infection
Infection is the means used by the malware to get into the smartphone, it can either use one of the faults previously presented or may use the gullibility of the user. Infections are classified into four classes according to their degree of user interaction. 
 Explicit permissionThe most benign interaction is to ask the user if it is allowed to infect the machine, clearly indicating its potential malicious behavior. This is typical behavior of a proof of concept malware.
 Implied permissionThis infection is based on the fact that the user has a habit of installing software. Most trojans try to seduce the user into installing attractive applications (games, useful applications etc.) that actually contain malware.
 Common interactionThis infection is related to a common behavior, such as opening an MMS or email.
 No interactionThe last class of infection is the most dangerous. Indeed, a worm that could infect a smartphone and could infect other smartphones without any interaction would be catastrophic.

Accomplishment of its goal 
Once the malware has infected a phone it will also seek to accomplish its goal, which is usually one of the following: monetary damage, damage data and/or device, and concealed damage. 
 Monetary damagesThe attacker can steal user data and either sell them to the same user or sell to a third party.
 DamageMalware can partially damage the device or delete or modify data on the device.
 Concealed damageThe two aforementioned types of damage are detectable, but the malware can also leave a backdoor for future attacks or even conduct wiretaps.

Spread to other systems 
Once the malware has infected a smartphone, it always aims to spread one way or another: 
 It can spread through proximate devices using Wi-Fi, Bluetooth and infrared.
 It can also spread using remote networks such as telephone calls or SMS or emails.

Examples of malware 
Here is various malware that exist in the world of smartphones with a short description of each.

Viruses and trojans 

 Cabir (also known as Caribe, SybmOS/Cabir, Symbian/Cabir and EPOC.cabir) is the name of a computer worm developed in 2004, designed to infect mobile phones running Symbian OS. It is believed to have been the first computer worm that can infect mobile phones.
 Commwarrior, founded in March 7, 2005, was the first worm that can infect many machines from MMS. It is sent as COMMWARRIOR.ZIP containing the file COMMWARRIOR.SIS. When this file is executed, Commwarrior attempts to connect to nearby devices by Bluetooth or infrared under a random name. It then attempts to send MMS message to the contacts in the smartphone with different header messages for each person, who receive the MMS and often open them without further verification.
 Phage is the first Palm OS virus discovered. It transfers to the Palm from a PC via synchronization. It infects all applications in the smartphone and embeds its own code to function without the user and the system detecting it. All that the system will detect is that its usual applications are functioning.
 RedBrowser is a Trojan based on java. The Trojan masquerades as a program called "RedBrowser" which allows the user to visit WAP sites without a WAP connection. During application installation, the user sees a request on their phone that the application needs permission to send messages. If the user accepts, RedBrowser can send SMS to paid call centers. This program uses the smartphone's connection to social networks (Facebook, Twitter, etc.) to get the contact information for the user's acquaintances (provided the required permissions have been given) and will send them messages.
 WinCE.PmCryptic.A is a malicious software on Windows Mobile which aims to earn money for its authors. It uses the infestation of memory cards that are inserted in the smartphone to spread more effectively. 
 CardTrap is a virus that is available on different types of smartphones, which aims to deactivate the system and third-party applications. It works by replacing the files used to start the smartphone and applications to prevent them from executing. There are different variants of this virus such as Cardtrap. A for SymbOS devices. It also infects the memory card with malware capable of infecting Windows.
 Ghost Push is malicious software on Android OS which automatically roots the android device and installs malicious applications directly to system partition then unroots the device to prevent users from removing the threat by master reset (The threat can be removed only by reflashing). It cripples the system resources, executes quickly, and is hard to detect.

Ransomware 
Mobile ransomware is a type of malware that locks users out of their mobile devices in a pay-to-unlock-your-device ploy, it has grown by leaps and bounds as a threat category since 2014. Specific to mobile computing platforms, users are often less security-conscious, particularly as it pertains to scrutinizing applications and web links trusting the native protection capability of the mobile device operating system. Mobile ransomware poses a significant threat to businesses reliant on instant access and availability of their proprietary information and contacts. The likelihood of a traveling businessman paying a ransom to unlock their device is significantly higher since they are at a disadvantage given inconveniences such as timeliness and less likely direct access to IT staff. Recent ransomware attack has caused a stir in the world as the attack caused many of the internet connected devices to not work and companies spent a large amount to recover from these attacks.

Spyware 

 Pegasus – In 2021, journalists and researchers reported the discovery of spyware, called Pegasus, developed and distributed by a private company which can and has been used to infect both iOS and Android smartphones often – partly via use of 0-day exploits – without the need for any user-interaction or significant clues to the user and then be used to exfiltrate data, track user locations, capture film through its camera, and activate the microphone at any time.
 Flexispy is an application that can be considered as a trojan, based on Symbian. The program sends all information received and sent from the smartphone to a Flexispy server. It was originally created to protect children and spy on adulterous spouses.

Number of malware 
Below is a diagram which loads the different behaviors of smartphone malware in terms of their effects on smartphones. 

We can see from the graph that at least 50 malware varieties exhibit no negative behavior, except their ability to spread.

Portability of malware across platforms 

There is a multitude of malware. This is partly due to the variety of operating systems on smartphones. However, attackers can also choose to make their malware target multiple platforms, and malware can be found which attacks an OS but is able to spread to different systems.

To begin with, malware can use runtime environments like Java virtual machine or the .NET Framework. They can also use other libraries present in many operating systems.  Other malwares carry several executable files in order to run in multiple environments and they utilize these during the propagation process. In practice, this type of malware requires a connection between the two operating systems to use as an attack vector. Memory cards can be used for this purpose, or synchronization software can be used to propagate the virus.

Countermeasures 

The security mechanisms in place to counter the threats described above are presented in this section. They are divided into different categories, as all do not act at the same level, and they range from the management of security by the operating system to the behavioral education of the user. The threats prevented by the various measures are not the same depending on the case. Considering the two cases mentioned above, in the first case one would protect the system from corruption by an application, and in the second case the installation of a suspicious software would be prevented.

Security in operating systems 

The first layer of security in a smartphone is the operating system (OS). Beyond needing to handle the usual roles of an operating system (e.g., resource management, scheduling processes) on the device, it must also establish the protocols for introducing external applications and data without introducing risk.

A central paradigm in mobile operating systems is the idea of a sandbox. Since smartphones are currently designed to accommodate many applications, they must have mechanisms to ensure these applications are safe for the phone itself, for other applications and data on the system, and for the user. If a malicious program reaches a mobile device, the vulnerable area presented by the system must be as small as possible. Sandboxing extends this idea to compartmentalize different processes, preventing them from interacting and damaging each other. Based on the history of operating systems, sandboxing has different implementations. For example, where iOS will focus on limiting access to its public API for applications from the App Store by default, Managed Open In allows you to restrict which apps can access which types of data. Android bases it's sandboxing on its legacy of Linux and TrustedBSD.

The following points highlight mechanisms implemented in operating systems, especially Android.

 Rootkit Detectors
 The intrusion of a rootkit in the system is a great danger in the same way as on a computer. It is important to prevent such intrusions, and to be able to detect them as often as possible. Indeed, there is concern that with this type of malicious program, the result could be a partial or complete bypass of the device security, and the acquisition of administrator rights by the attacker. If this happens, then nothing prevents the attacker from studying or disabling the safety features that were circumvented, deploying the applications they want, or disseminating a method of intrusion by a rootkit to a wider audience. We can cite, as a defense mechanism, the Chain of trust in iOS. This mechanism relies on the signature of the different applications required to start the operating system, and a certificate signed by Apple. In the event that the signature checks are inconclusive, the device detects this and stops the boot-up.  If the operating system is compromised due to jailbreaking, rootkit detection may not work if it is disabled by the jailbreak method or software is loaded after jailbreak disables Rootkit Detection.

 Process isolation
 Android uses mechanisms of user process isolation inherited from Linux. Each application has a user associated with it, and a tuple (UID, GID). This approach serves as a sandbox: while applications can be malicious, they cannot get out of the sandbox reserved for them by their identifiers, and thus cannot interfere with the proper functioning of the system. For example, since it is impossible for a process to end the process of another user, an application can thus not stop the execution of another. 

 File permissions
 From the legacy of Linux, there are also filesystem permissions mechanisms. They help with sandboxing: a process cannot edit any files it wants. It is therefore not possible to freely corrupt files necessary for the operation of another application or system. Furthermore, in Android there is the method of locking memory permissions. It is not possible to change the permissions of files installed on the SD card from the phone, and consequently it is impossible to install applications. 

 Memory Protection
 In the same way as on a computer, memory protection prevents privilege escalation. Indeed, if a process managed to reach the area allocated to other processes, it could write in the memory of a process with rights superior to their own, with root in the worst case, and perform actions which are beyond its permissions on the system. It would suffice to insert function calls are authorized by the privileges of the malicious application. 

 Development through runtime environments
 Software is often developed in high-level languages, which can control what is being done by a running program. For example, Java Virtual Machines continuously monitor the actions of the execution threads they manage, monitor and assign resources, and prevent malicious actions. Buffer overflows can be prevented by these controls.

Security software

Above the operating system security, there is a layer of security software. This layer is composed of individual components to strengthen various vulnerabilities: prevent malware, intrusions, the identification of a user as a human, and user authentication. It contains software components that have learned from their experience with computer security; however, on smartphones, this software must deal with greater constraints (see limitations).

 Antivirus and firewall
 An antivirus software can be deployed on a device to verify that it is not infected by a known threat, usually by signature detection software that detects malicious executable files. A firewall, meanwhile, can watch over the existing traffic on the network and ensure that a malicious application does not seek to communicate through it. It may equally verify that an installed application does not seek to establish suspicious communication, which may prevent an intrusion attempt. 
A mobile antivirus product would scan files and compare them against a database of known mobile malware code signatures.
 Visual Notifications
 In order to make the user aware of any abnormal actions, such as a call they did not initiate, one can link some functions to a visual notification that is impossible to circumvent. For example, when a call is triggered, the called number should always be displayed. Thus, if a call is triggered by a malicious application, the user can see, and take appropriate action.

 Turing test
 In the same vein as above, it is important to confirm certain actions by a user decision. The Turing test is used to distinguish between a human and a virtual user, and it often comes as a captcha.

 Biometric identification
 Another method to use is biometrics.  Biometrics is a technique of identifying a person by means of their morphology (by recognition of the face or eye, for example) or their behavior (their signature or way of writing for example). One advantage of using biometric security is that users can avoid having to remember a password or other secret combination to authenticate and prevent malicious users from accessing their devices. In a system with strong biometric security, only the primary user can access the smartphone.

Resource monitoring in the smartphone 
When an application passes the various security barriers, it can take the actions for which it was designed. When such actions are triggered, the activity of a malicious application can be sometimes detected if one monitors the various resources used on the phone. Depending on the goals of the malware, the consequences of infection are not always the same; all malicious applications are not intended to harm the devices on which they are deployed. The following sections describe different ways to detect suspicious activity. 

 Battery
 Some malware is aimed at exhausting the energy resources of the phone. Monitoring the energy consumption of the phone can be a way to detect certain malware applications. 

 Memory usage
 Memory usage is inherent in any application. However, if one finds that a substantial proportion of memory is used by an application, it may be flagged as suspicious.

 Network traffic
 On a smartphone, many applications are bound to connect via the network, as part of their normal operation. However, an application using a lot of bandwidth can be strongly suspected of attempting to communicate a lot of information and disseminate data to many other devices. This observation only allows a suspicion, because some legitimate applications can be very resource-intensive in terms of network communications, the best example being streaming video.

 Services
 One can monitor the activity of various services of a smartphone. During certain moments, some services should not be active, and if one is detected, the application should be suspected. For example, the sending of an SMS when the user is filming video: this communication does not make sense and is suspicious; malware may attempt to send SMS while its activity is masked. 

The various points mentioned above are only indications and do not provide certainty about the legitimacy of the activity of an application. However, these criteria can help target suspicious applications, especially if several criteria are combined.

Network surveillance 
Network traffic exchanged by phones can be monitored. One can place safeguards in network routing points in order to detect abnormal behavior. As the mobile's use of network protocols is much more constrained than that of a computer, expected network data streams can be predicted (e.g., the protocol for sending an SMS), which permits detection of anomalies in mobile networks. 

 Spam filters
 As is the case with email exchanges, we can detect a spam campaign through means of mobile communications (SMS, MMS). It is therefore possible to detect and minimize this kind of attempt by filters deployed on network infrastructure that is relaying these messages.

 Encryption of stored or transmitted information
 Because it is always possible that data exchanged can be intercepted, communications, or even information storage, can rely on encryption to prevent a malicious entity from using any data obtained during communications. However, this poses the problem of key exchange for encryption algorithms, which requires a secure channel.

 Telecom network monitoring
 The networks for SMS and MMS exhibit predictable behavior, and there is not as much liberty compared with what one can do with protocols such as TCP or UDP. This implies that one cannot predict the use made of the common protocols of the web; one might generate very little traffic by consulting simple pages, rarely, or generate heavy traffic by using video streaming. On the other hand, messages exchanged via mobile phone have a framework and a specific model, and the user does not, in a normal case, have the freedom to intervene in the details of these communications. Therefore, if an abnormality is found in the flux of network data in the mobile networks, the potential threat can be quickly detected.

Manufacturer surveillance 
In the production and distribution chain for mobile devices, it is the responsibility of manufacturers to ensure that devices are delivered in a basic configuration without vulnerabilities. Most users are not experts and many of them are not aware of the existence of security vulnerabilities, so the device configuration as provided by manufacturers will be retained by many users. Below are listed several points which manufacturers should consider. Some of the smartphone manufacturers insert Titan M2 to powers up mobile security.

 Remove debug mode
 Phones are sometimes set in a debug mode during manufacturing, but this mode must be disabled before the phone is sold. This mode allows access to different features, not intended for routine use by a user. Due to the speed of development and production, distractions occur, and some devices are sold in debug mode. This kind of deployment exposes mobile devices to exploits that utilize this oversight. 

 Default settings
 When a smartphone is sold, its default settings must be correct, and not leave security gaps. The default configuration is not always changed, so a good initial setup is essential for users. There are, for example, default configurations that are vulnerable to denial-of-service attacks. 

 Security audit of apps
 Along with smart phones, Appstore's have emerged. A user finds themselves facing a huge range of applications. This is especially true for providers who manage Appstore's because they are tasked with examining the apps provided, from different points of view (e.g., security, content). The security audit should be particularly cautious, because if a fault is not detected, the application can spread very quickly within a few days, and infect a significant number of devices. 

 Detect suspicious applications demanding rights
 When installing applications, it is good to warn the user against sets of permissions that, grouped together, seem potentially dangerous, or at least suspicious. Frameworks like such as Kirin, on Android, attempt to detect and prohibit certain sets of permissions. 

 Revocation procedures
 Along with Appstore's appeared a new feature for mobile apps: remote revocation. First developed by Android, this procedure can remotely and globally uninstall an application, on any device that has it. This means the spread of a malicious application that managed to evade security checks can be immediately stopped when the threat is discovered. 

 Avoid heavily customized systems
 Manufacturers are tempted to overlay custom layers on existing operating systems, with the dual purpose of offering customized options and disabling or charging for certain features. This has the dual effect of risking the introduction of new bugs in the system, coupled with an incentive for users to modify the systems to circumvent the manufacturer's restrictions. These systems are rarely as stable and reliable as the original and may suffer from phishing attempts or other exploits.

 Improve software patch processes
 New versions of various software components of a smartphone, including operating systems, are regularly published. They correct many flaws over time. Nevertheless, manufacturers often do not deploy these updates to their devices in a timely fashion, and sometimes not at all. Thus, vulnerabilities persist when they could be corrected, and if they are not, since they are known, they are easily exploitable.

User awareness 
Much malicious behavior is allowed by the carelessness of the user. Smartphone users were found to ignore security messages during application installation, especially during application selection, checking application reputation, reviews and security and agreement messages. From simply not leaving the device without a password, to precise control of permissions granted to applications added to the smartphone, the user has a large responsibility in the cycle of security: to not be the vector of intrusion. This precaution is especially important if the user is an employee of a company who stores business data on the device. Detailed below are some precautions that a user can take to manage security on a smartphone.

A recent survey by internet security experts BullGuard showed a lack of insight into the rising number of malicious threats affecting mobile phones, with 53% of users claiming that they are unaware of security software for Smartphones. A further 21% argued that such protection was unnecessary, and 42% admitted it hadn't crossed their mind ("Using APA," 2011). These statistics show consumers are not concerned about security risks because they believe it is not a serious problem. The key here is to always remember smartphones are effectively handheld computers and are just as vulnerable.

 Being skeptical
 A user should not believe everything that may be presented, as some information may be phishing or attempting to distribute a malicious application. It is therefore advisable to check the reputation of the application that they want to buy before actually installing it. 

 Permissions given to applications
 The mass distribution of applications is accompanied by the establishment of different permissions mechanisms for each operating system. It is necessary to clarify these permissions mechanisms to users, as they differ from one system to another, and are not always easy to understand. In addition, it is rarely possible to modify a set of permissions requested by an application if the number of permissions is too great. But this last point is a source of risk because a user can grant rights to an application, far beyond the rights it needs. For example, a note taking application does not require access to the geolocation service. The user must ensure the privileges required by an application during installation and should not accept the installation if requested rights are inconsistent. 

 Be careful
 Protection of a user's phone through simple gestures and precautions, such as locking the smartphone when it is not in use, not leaving their device unattended, not trusting applications, not storing sensitive data, or encrypting sensitive data that cannot be separated from the device. 

Disconnect peripheral devices, that are not in use
NIST Guidelines for Managing the Security of Mobile Devices 2013, recommends: Restrict user and application access to hardware, such as the digital camera, GPS, Bluetooth interface, USB interface, and removable storage.

Enable Android Device Encryption 
The latest Android smartphones come with an inbuilt encryption setting for securing all the information saved on your device. It makes it difficult for a hacker to extract and decipher the information in case your device is compromised. Here is how to do it,

Settings – Security – Encrypt Phone + Encrypt SD Card

 Ensure data
 Smartphones have a significant memory and can carry several gigabytes of data. The user must be careful about what data it carries and whether they should be protected. While it is usually not dramatic if a song is copied, a file containing bank information or business data can be riskier. The user must have the prudence to avoid the transmission of sensitive data on a smartphone, which can be easily stolen. Furthermore, when a user gets rid of a device, they must be sure to remove all personal data first. 

These precautions are measures that leave no easy solution to the intrusion of people or malicious applications in a smartphone. If users are careful, many attacks can be defeated, especially phishing and applications seeking only to obtain rights on a device.

Centralized storage of text messages
One form of mobile protection allows companies to control the delivery and storage of text messages, by hosting the messages on a company server, rather than on the sender or receiver's phone. When certain conditions are met, such as an expiration date, the messages are deleted.

Limitations of certain security measures 
The security mechanisms mentioned in this article are to a large extent inherited from knowledge and experience with computer security. The elements composing the two device types are similar, and there are common measures that can be used, such as antivirus software and firewalls. However, the implementation of these solutions is not necessarily possible or at least highly constrained within a mobile device. The reason for this difference is the technical resources offered by computers and mobile devices: even though the computing power of smartphones is becoming faster, they have other limitations than their computing power.
 Single-task system: Some operating systems, including some still commonly used, are single-tasking. Only the foreground task is executed. It is difficult to introduce applications such as antivirus and firewall on such systems, because they could not perform their monitoring while the user is operating the device, when there would be most need of such monitoring.
 Energy autonomy: A critical one for the use of a smartphone is energy autonomy. It is important that the security mechanisms not consume battery resources, without which the autonomy of devices will be affected dramatically, undermining the effective use of the smartphone.
 Network Directly related to battery life, network utilization should not be too high. It is indeed one of the most expensive resources, from the point of view of energy consumption. Nonetheless, some calculations may need to be relocated to remote servers in order to preserve the battery. This balance can make implementation of certain intensive computation mechanisms a delicate proposition. 

Furthermore, it is common to find that updates exist, or can be developed or deployed, but this is not always done. One can, for example, find a user who does not know that there is a newer version of the operating system compatible with the smartphone, or a user may discover known vulnerabilities that are not corrected until the end of a long development cycle, which allows time to exploit the loopholes.

Next Generation of mobile security 

There is expected to be four mobile environments that will make up the security framework:

 Rich operating system In this category will fall traditional Mobile OS like Android, iOS, Symbian OS or Windows Phone. They will provide the traditional functionality and security of an OS to the applications.

Secure Operating System (Secure OS) A secure kernel which will run in parallel with a fully featured Rich OS, on the same processor core. It will include drivers for the Rich OS ("normal world") to communicate with the secure kernel ("secure world"). The trusted infrastructure could include interfaces like the display or keypad to regions of PCI-E address space and memories.

Trusted Execution Environment (TEE) Made up of hardware and software. It helps in the control of access rights and houses sensitive applications, which need to be isolated from the Rich OS. It effectively acts as a firewall between the "normal world" and "secure world".

 Secure Element (SE) The SE consists of tamper resistant hardware and associated software or separate isolated hardware. It can provide high levels of security and work in tandem with the TEE. The SE will be mandatory for hosting proximity payment applications or official electronic signatures. SE may connect, disconnect, block peripheral devices and operate separate set of hardware.

 Security Applications (SA) Numerous security applications are available on App Stores providing services of protection from viruses and performing vulnerability assessment.

See also 
 Browser security
 Computer security
 Information security
 Mobile Malware
 Mobile secure gateway
 Phone hacking
 Telephone tapping
 Wireless Public Key Infrastructure (WPKI)
 Wireless security
 Defense strategy (computing)

Notes

References

Books

Articles

Websites

Further reading